James Arthur Kelsey (August 28, 1952 – June 3, 2007) was the tenth bishop of the Episcopal Diocese of Northern Michigan, based in Marquette.

Biography
Kelsey, whose twin brother, the Reverend Stephen Kelsey, is a priest in the Episcopal Diocese of Connecticut, was born and reared in Baltimore and received degrees from Ithaca College and General Theological Seminary. He was ordained a deacon in 1977 and a priest in 1978 by Bishop Robert S. Kerr of the Diocese of Vermont. A proponent of Total Ministry, he served from 1985 to 1989 as canon missioner for cluster ministries in the Oklahoma, then served for 10 years as ministry development coordinator in Northern Michigan before being elected bishop in 1999.

He was married and had three grown children.

Kelsey was consecrated July 24, 1999, at St. Michael Roman Catholic Church, Marquette. The chief consecrator to the office of bishop was Presiding Bishop Frank Griswold. His consecrators included his predecessor as bishop of Northern Michigan, Thomas K. Ray, Edward L. Lee of Western Michigan, R. Stewart Wood of Michigan, and Edwin M. Leidel of Eastern Michigan. Kelsey was the 948th bishop in the Episcopal succession.

Death
Kelsey died in a car accident while returning home from a parish visitation. Jim Kelsey's funeral service on June 9, 2007, drew more than 600 friends and colleagues in ministry. "There is no one to step in and replace Jim. It is a loss we cannot replace," said Tom Ray, who preceded Kelsey as Northern Michigan's diocesan bishop. Recounting the feeling in the room when the Standing Committee and the Core Team met one day after Kelsey died, Ray said, "this must be how the disciples felt after Jesus' crucifixion."

References

External links
 Episcopal Diocese of Northern Michigan
 Web site of the Episcopal Church

1952 births
2007 deaths
People from Marquette, Michigan
Road incident deaths in Michigan
20th-century American Episcopalians
Episcopal bishops of Northern Michigan
20th-century American clergy